Henry Simon may refer to:
Hank Simon (1862–1925), Major League Baseball Outfielder
Henry Simon (politician) (1874–1926), French industrialist and politician
Henry Gustav Simon (1835–1899), founder of Simon Carves

See also
Harry Simon (disambiguation)